Melekeok is a town in the State of Melekeok (one of Palau's sixteen states). It is located on the east coast of Palau's largest island, Babeldaob.

Demographics
According to the 2005 census, 271 people resided in Melekeok town.

Gallery

References

External links

Seacology Melekeok State Project Seacology

Populated places in Palau
Melekeok